Tõnu Juul (born 21 April 1958 Viljandi) is an Estonian physician and politician. He was a member of VII Riigikogu.

References

Living people
1958 births
Members of the Riigikogu, 1992–1995
Members of the Riigikogu, 2007–2011
Members of the Riigikogu, 2011–2015